Felipe Guzmán (born 17 October 1967) is a Mexican former wrestler who competed in the 1996 Summer Olympics.

References

External links
 

1967 births
Living people
Olympic wrestlers of Mexico
Wrestlers at the 1996 Summer Olympics
Mexican male sport wrestlers
Pan American Games medalists in wrestling
Pan American Games silver medalists for Mexico
Wrestlers at the 1991 Pan American Games
Medalists at the 1991 Pan American Games
20th-century Mexican people
21st-century Mexican people